The UNC Gillings School of Global Public Health is the public health school at the University of North Carolina at Chapel Hill, a public research university in Chapel Hill, North Carolina. It offers undergraduate and graduate degrees and is accredited by the Council on Education for Public Health.

In 2020, the institution was ranked the best public school and second best school overall in the U.S. News & World Report ranking of American schools of public health. Among schools of public health, the school receives the third most funding in NIH awards.

History
The UNC Division of Public Health was organized in 1936 within the UNC School of Medicine. Separate status as a school of public health was granted in 1940, making the school the first school of public health established within a state university. The school awarded its first graduate degrees in 1940.

Milton Rosenau became the first director of the Division of Public Health in 1936 and served as the first dean of the School from 1939 to 1946. In 1949, both the UNC School of Dentistry and UNC School of Nursing were added. Along with the Schools of Public Health, Medicine and Pharmacy, the five schools formally became the University's Division of Health Affairs.

It is named after donors Joan Gillings and Dennis Gillings, a former UNC professor and the founder of IQVIA.

In 2020, the school focused its resources on combating the spread of the COVID-19 global pandemic, with various research teams tackling a broad range of topics including vaccines, testing, epidemiology, biostatistics, health policy and more.

Academics 
In 2018, the Gillings School launched its online Master of Public Health program.

Notable faculty 
Mandy Cohen, physician and health official
Clarence Lushbaugh, physician and pathologist
William L. Roper, dean emeritus, 12th Director of the CDC

Alumni 

 Lisa Bodnar (M.P.H. 1999), Vice-Chair for Research, University of Pittsburgh
 Julie Story Byerley (M.P.H. 1998), Vice Dean for Education, UNC School of Medicine
 Garry Conille (M.P.H. 1999), 15th Prime Minister of Haiti
 Renee M. Johnson (M.P.H. 1998, Ph.D. 2004), researcher and academic, Johns Hopkins Bloomberg School of Public Health 
 Jonathan J. Juliano (M.P.H.1997), researcher and academic, UNC School of Medicine 
 Jerry M. Linenger (M.P.H. 1989, Ph.D. 1989), former Captain in the U.S. Navy Medical Corps, and former NASA astronaut
 Heather Munroe-Blum (Ph.D.), former Principal and Vice-Chancellor, McGill University
 Vann R. Newkirk II (M.Sc. 2012), staff writer, The Atlantic
 Rob Wittman (M.P.H. 1990), U.S. Representative for Virginia's 1st congressional district

See also
Carolina Population Center

References

External links
 Official website

Gillings School of Global Public Health
Medical and health organizations based in North Carolina
Schools of public health in the United States
Educational institutions established in 1940
1940 establishments in North Carolina